A dressmaker, also known as a seamstress, is a person who makes clothing for women, such as dresses, blouses, and evening gowns. Dressmakers were historically known as mantua-makers, and are also known as a modiste or fabrician.

Notable dressmakers
Cristóbal Balenciaga
Pierre Balmain
Coco Chanel
Christian Dior
David Emanuel
Norman Hartnell, royal dressmaker
Elizabeth Keckley, modiste and confidante to Mary Todd Lincoln
Jean Muir, fashion designer
 Madame Palmyre, a favorite designer and dressmaker of the empress of France
Anna and Laura Tirocchi, Providence, Rhode Island
Isabel Toledo
Madeleine Vionnet
R'Bonney Gabriel, fashion designer and beauty queen of Miss Universe 2022
Mak Tumang, fashion designer
Janet Walker, costumier and dress-making-bust inventor
Charles Frederick Worth

Related terms

 "Dressmaker" denotes clothing made in the style of a dressmaker, frequently in the term "dressmaker details", which includes ruffles, frills, ribbon or braid trim. "Dressmaker" in this sense is contrasted to "tailored" and has fallen out of use since the rise of casual wear in the mid-20th century.
 Mantua-maker, in the 18th century a maker of mantuas, or in general a dressmaker.
 Modiste, a maker of fashionable clothing and accessories, with the implication that the articles made reflect the current Paris fashions.
 Fabrician, a person who is considered an expert in making modifications and alterations to fabrics and other articles of clothing.
 Sewing professional is the most general term for those who make their living by sewing, teaching, writing about sewing, or retailing sewing supplies. A sewing professional may work out of the home, a studio, or a retail shop and work part-time or full-time. This work may include any or all of the following sub-specialties:
 A custom clothier makes custom garments one at a time, to order, to meet an individual customer's needs and preferences.
 A custom dressmaker specializes in women's custom apparel, including day dresses, career wear, suits, evening or bridal wear, sportswear, or lingerie.
 A tailor/tailoress makes custom menswear-style jackets and the skirts or trousers that go with them for men or women. 
 An alterations specialist or alterationist adjusts the fit of completed garments, usually ready-to-wear, or restyles them. Note that while all tailors can do alterations, by no means can all alterationists do tailoring.
 Designers choose combinations of line, proportion, color, and texture for intended garments. They may have no sewing or patternmaking skills and only sketch or conceptualize garments.
 Patternmakers flat draft the shapes and sizes of numerous pieces of a garment by hand using paper and measuring tools, computer using CAD software, or by draping muslin on a dress form.
 A wardrobe consultant or fashion advisor recommends styles and colors for a client.
 A seamstress is a woman who sews, especially one who earns a living by sewing. Before the Industrial Revolution, a seamstress did hand sewing, especially under the putting-out system. Older variants are seamster and sempstress.
A costume designer is a person who designs costumes for a film, stage production, or television show.

See also
Bespoke
Fashion design
Haute couture
Sewing
Tailor

References

Further reading
Butterick Publishing Company: "The Art of Garment Cutting, Fitting and Making", 1894.
Deckert, Barbara: Sewing for Plus Sizes: Design, Fit and Construction for Ample Apparel, Taunton, 1999, Appendix B: How to Find, Select, and Work With a Custom Clothier, pp. 142–143.
Kirke, Betty: "Madeleine Vionnet", Chronicle Books, 1998.
Picken, Mary Brooks: The Fashion Dictionary, Funk and Wagnalls, 1957.

External links

Fashion occupations
Sewing
Tailors